Imber is a depopulated village in Wiltshire, England.

Imber may also refer to:

Imber (surname)
 IMBER, an international project on ocean biogeochemical cycles and ecosystems
 Imber tropicus, a moth of the family Sphingidae